Salisbury-Ocean City: Wicomico Regional Airport , or, more succinctly Salisbury Regional Airport, is located in unincorporated Wicomico County, Maryland,  southeast from downtown Salisbury, Maryland, United States. Salisbury is the largest metropolitan area of Maryland's Eastern Shore with a population of 405,803 in the metropolitan statistical area, and is centrally located on the Delmarva Peninsula.

Since SBY Regional Airport is the only commercial airport with daily scheduled flights in the area, it also serves Delaware, the Eastern Shore of Virginia, and the Eastern Shore of Maryland, which include the other towns of Ocean City, Cambridge, and Easton. American Eagle operates approximately two round trip flights per day to Charlotte Douglas International Airport, and two round trip flights per day to Philadelphia International Airport.

History
In 1940, Wicomico County and the City of Salisbury begun to construct the airport with the Works Progress Administration. It originally encompassed 695 acres and cost $1.5 million. Officially opened on November 11, 1943, Salisbury was originally leased to the U.S. Navy as a training base during World War II up through 1945.

After the war ended, Airfield Operating Corp. leased the airport beginning commercial activity to Easton, Baltimore, and Washington D.C. Later, in 1949 the City and County resume management of the airport and All American Airways takes over for Chesapeake Airways, later superseded in 1950 by Allegheny Airlines. Numerous improvement projects including runway resurfacing and taxiway lights were installed in the 1960s. Henson Aviation, under contract with Allegheny Airlines and owned by Richard A. Henson, began scheduled commuter service in 1968 and operated with the idea of using "frequency" flights using small aircraft which would shuttle passengers to many airports along the east coast. However, Allegheny discontinued the service in 1969. In 1971, the City of Salisbury relinquishes its interest to the county. In 1978, the Maryland State Police establish a medevac helicopter base.

In 1983, Henson Aviation was purchased by Piedmont Airlines and began operating as Henson, The Piedmont Regional Airline. Henson Airways reigned as the primary air service provider in Salisbury until US Airways Express purchased Henson Aviation in 1993. After the merger, the airline was renamed Piedmont and it deemed Salisbury as its primary operating base and quickly grew into a large regional carrier. After opening the base, the airline operated flights to Philadelphia and Washington. A few years later, Piedmont opened a new hub in Charlotte, North Carolina which rapidly grew to become larger than its hub in Washington D.C. The service to Washington was later cancelled and was replaced with service to Charlotte..

In 2017, the airport re-branded itself SBY Regional Airport.

Airport construction and expansion
Along with the main runway being extended, the taxiways around the runway were extended and a new ILS system was installed with new approaches. These multimillion-dollar projects will allow flights using larger aircraft such as regional jets which had previously been unable to operate at the airport due to the short length of the runway. Today, the airport spans 1,081 acres (437 ha) and is the second-largest in the state of Maryland. In 2017, it was announced that the interior of the terminal would be updated with a coastal theme.

Facilities

The Richard A. Henson Terminal is a  building opened in 1990. There is an American Eagle ticket counter and a TSA bag scanning area at the southeast part of the building. Two departure gates, one arrival gate, and security checkpoints are in the middle and northwest part of the terminal.

Avis, Hertz, and Enterprise all operate automobile rental services in the arrival terminal.

In 2022, airport parking was upgraded to an automated parking system, from the previous contractor staffed gate.

Fixed-base operators
Bayland Aviation is the fixed-base operator at Salisbury. Jet fuel and Avgas are handled and supplied by Bayland. They also offer public flight training using a group of small Cessna and Piper aircraft. Charter flights can be scheduled through Bayland to multiple destinations throughout the East Coast.

Airlines and destinations
The airport is the operational headquarters for American Eagle carrier Piedmont Airlines. In 2012, Piedmont established a passenger record of 150,086 passengers.

Passenger airlines

Current destinations map

Top destinations

Terminated passenger airline services
Piedmont previously served Salisbury with flights to Washington D.C. and Baltimore. The service to Washington was on and off until 2008; the Baltimore service stopped in late 2009.

Allegiant Air began twice a week service to Orlando-Sanford International Airport in February 2012, using its McDonnell Douglas MD-80 jets, but ended the route less than a year later on January 5, 2013, due to the route's relatively small number of passengers.

Cargo airlines

Local carriers

References

External links

 Salisbury-Ocean City: Wicomico Regional Airport
 Bay Land Aviation, Inc. - exclusive fixed-base operator
 FAA Airport Details

Airports in Maryland
Salisbury, Maryland
Transportation buildings and structures in Wicomico County, Maryland
Airports established in 1943
1943 establishments in Maryland